Edward Dean Duggan (May 19, 1891 – October 16, 1950) was an American football player and coach. He played college football at the University of Notre Dame from 1911 to 1914 and professionally for the Rock Island Independents of the National Football League (NFL) in 1921. Duggan was the head football coach at Franklin College in Franklin, Indiana from 1922 to 1927.  He coached high school football in Houston, Texas, at Sam Houston High School from 1928 to 1936 and then at Lamar High School from 1937 until his retirement in 1946.  Duggan died of heart attack on October 16, 1950, in Houston.

References

External links
 

1891 births
1950 deaths
American football fullbacks
Franklin Grizzlies football coaches
Notre Dame Fighting Irish football players
Rock Island Independents players
High school football coaches in Texas
People from Johnson County, Indiana
Players of American football from Indiana